Shawn Adam Levy (born July 23, 1968) is a Canadian film director, film producer, actor, and founder of 21 Laps Entertainment. He has worked across genres and is perhaps best known as the director of the Night at the Museum film franchise and primary producer of the Netflix series Stranger Things.

Following early work as a television director, Levy gained recognition in the 2000s for directing comedy films like Big Fat Liar and Just Married before subsequently helming the Cheaper by the Dozen, The Pink Panther, and Night at the Museum film franchises. In the early 2010s, he directed films including Date Night and Real Steel, developed several comedy television pilots, and executive produced the ABC sitcom Last Man Standing. Levy was considered a producer on the 2016 sci-fi film Arrival, which earned him an Academy Award nomination for Best Picture.

Since 2016, Levy has been an executive producer on the Netflix original series Stranger Things. He has directed the third and fourth episodes of each of the show's four seasons. He has also worked on upcoming Netflix limited series All the Light We Cannot See. Most recently, he has collaborated with Ryan Reynolds by directing Free Guy (2021), The Adam Project (2022), and the upcoming Deadpool 3 (2024).

Early life
Levy was born to a Jewish family with two siblings, Rob and Debby, in Montreal, Quebec. As a teenager, he attended St. George's High School in Montreal and trained at the Stagedoor Manor Performing Arts Training Center in New York's Catskills. Pursuing a career in acting, he attended the performing arts program at Yale University, graduating in 1989; during his time there, he became interested in directing and subsequently moved to Los Angeles to study film directing. He received a MFA from the USC School of Cinematic Arts in 1994.

Career

1985–1994: Early career and education 
Levy began his professional career while pursuing his undergraduate and graduate degrees in the mid-1980s through the mid-1990s. While studying performing arts, he made his acting debut was in Zombie Nightmare (1987), a low-budget horror film in which he portrayed the character Jim Bratten, the leader of a group of teenagers. The film is best known for being featured in an episode of Mystery Science Theater 3000. He also appeared in the 1988 film Liberace: Behind the Music.

He subsequently pursued his MFA in production, during which time he continued to act with a guest spot on 21 Jump Street and a recurring role on Beverly Hills, 90210. Since this time, he has acted in primary small and cameo roles as well like on 30 Rock as TV producer Scottie Shofar.

1995–2014: Directorial career and 20th Century Fox 
Through the end of the 1990s, Levy worked primarily as a television director of teen dramas, like Nickelodeon's The Secret World of Alex Mack and Animorphs. He was the primary director and executive producer (season 3) of the Disney Channel coming-of-age show The Famous Jett Jackson (1998–2002) and its companion film (2001).He made his feature film directorial debut in 1997 with the family films Address Unknown and Just in Time. This was followed by the 2002 teen comedy Big Fat Liar, his first theatrical release, and the 2003 rom com Just Married, which made more than $100 million in the box office. For the remainder of the decade, Levy worked successfully on big-budget family films, namely directing Cheaper by the Dozen (2003), The Pink Panther (2006), and Night at the Museum franchise (2006–2014)—and produced all of their sequel films. The first Night at the Museum film was Levy's most commercially successful project and one of the highest-grossing films of 2006. During this time he also produced the 2008 films What Happens in Vegas and The Rocker and executive produced The WB dramedy Pepper Dennis (2006).

Levy directed and produced the 2010 comedy Date Night starring Steve Carrell and Tina Fey. The same year, he began directing the sci fi drama Real Steel (2011), starring Hugh Jackman. Executive produced by Steven Spielberg, the film received mixed critical reviews and was nominated for the Academy Award for Best Visual Effects.

In the mid-2000s, Levy and his company 21 Laps signed a production deal with 20th Century Fox; it was renewed in 2010. Following this deal, Levy created a new television company with Marty Adelstein at 20th Century Fox TV to develop comedy series. Levy and 21 Laps were with the company until 2020. Since 2011, he has been the executive producer of the Tim Allen sitcom Last Man Standing. He also executive produced the short-lived ABC sitcoms Cristela (2014–2015) and Imaginary Mary (2017). Film projects with FOX include the 2012 Ben Stiller, Vince Vaughn, Jonah Hill comedy The Watch (directed by Akiva Schaffer), Levy's comedy The Internship (2013), Night at the Museum: Secret of the Tomb (2014), Why Him? (2016), and The Darkest Minds (2018). He produced similar films for Warner Bros.; Levy was initially announced as the director of the film version of Minecraft but has since left the project.

Outside of 20th Century Fox, Levy worked to expand 21 Laps' range outside of primarily family-friendly comedies; this included producing the A24 drama The Spectacular Now (2013), the ensemble dramedy This Is Where I Leave You (2014), and the Academy Award-winning sci fi film Arrival (2016). For his role in Arrival, Levy was nominated for an Academy Award for Best Picture.

2015–present: Stranger Things and Netflix 
He was announced to be directing the film adaptation of the Uncharted video game series, following David O. Russell and Neil Burger. Joe Carnahan worked with Levy to produce the script for the film, but Levy left the project on December 19, 2018. Levy was attached to produce a film based on the long-running children's series Sesame Street, which will be the show's third motion picture following Sesame Street Presents: Follow That Bird and The Adventures of Elmo in Grouchland, and its first in over two decades.

In December 2017, Netflix announced a 4-year contract with Levy. Due to the successful seasons of Stranger Things, he will create TV projects exclusively for the streaming entertainment company. In 2020, 21 Laps extended its deal with Netflix and signed a first look deal.

In 2021, Levy produced the film adaptation of the slasher novel There's Someone Inside Your House by Stephanie Perkins under his 21 Laps Entertainment label, alongside James Wan's Atomic Monster studio for Netflix. Alongside Eric Heisserer, he also executive produced the 2021 Netflix series Shadow and Bone, an adaptation of the fantasy book series The Grisha Trilogy and the Six of Crows Duology, under Netflix's deal with Levy's 21 Laps. Levy directed The Adam Project for Netflix starring Ryan Reynolds in the lead role.

In February 2022, it was announced that Levy will helm Backwards for Netflix. In March 2022, it was announced that Levy would direct Deadpool 3 for Marvel Studios. In November 2022, Levy entered talks to direct a Star Wars movie for Lucasfilm, following the conclusion of his work on Deadpool 3 and the fifth and final season of Stranger Things.

Personal life
Levy and his wife Serena Levy have four daughters together. Following many years living in Los Angeles, the Levy family moved to Manhattan in the early 2020s. Since 2009, he has also maintained a family home in the Hudson Valley community of New Paltz, New York.

Filmography

Film

Producer only

Acting credits

Television 

Executive producer only
 Last Man Standing (2011–2016)
 Cristela (2014)
 I Am Not Okay with This (2020)
 Dash & Lily (2020)
 Unsolved Mysteries (2020)
 Shadow and Bone (2021–present)
 Lost Ollie (2022)
 Real Steel (TBA)

Acting roles

Awards and nominations

References

External links

1968 births
20th-century Canadian male actors
21st-century Canadian male actors
Action film directors
Anglophone Quebec people
Comedy film directors
Fantasy film directors
Film directors from Montreal
Jewish Canadian male actors
Living people
Skydance Media people
Male actors from Montreal
Science fiction film directors
Timothy Dwight College alumni
Yale University alumni